Van Den Daele is a Dutch surname. Notable people with the surname include:

 Engelbert van den Daele (1496–1556), Dutch politician
 Erwin Vandendaele (born 1945), Belgian footballer and manager
 Thierry Van Den Daele (born 1966), French tennis player

Surnames of Dutch origin